Ca anastigma is a moth in the family Dalceridae. It was described by Harrison Gray Dyar Jr. in 1914. It is found in Panama. The habitat consists of tropical moist forests.

References

Moths described in 1914
Dalceridae